Omri Luzon (born 7 January 1999) is an Israeli professional footballer who plays as a centre back for Hapoel Rishon LeZion. He has represented Israel at youth international level.

Club career
Luzon began his career at Maccabi Petah Tikva, making his professional debut in the Israeli Premier League in May 2017 as a substitute in a 0–0 draw with Maccabi Haifa. In September 2020, it was reported that Luzon was training with Championship side Reading ahead of signing a three-year deal with the club. On 30 October 2020, despite no official announcement from the club, he made his debut for Reading U23s in a Premier League 2 match. On 15 December 2020, it was officially announced that Luzon had joined Reading on a contract until June 2021.

International career
Luzon has represented Israel up to under-21 level.

Career statistics

References

External links

1999 births
Living people
Israeli footballers
Israel youth international footballers
Israeli Premier League players
Liga Leumit players
Maccabi Petah Tikva F.C. players
Hapoel Hadera F.C. players
Hapoel Nof HaGalil F.C. players
Hapoel Ashkelon F.C. players
Hapoel Rishon LeZion F.C. players
Reading F.C. players
Expatriate footballers in England
Israeli expatriate sportspeople in England
Footballers from Petah Tikva
Israeli people of Libyan-Jewish descent
Association football defenders